Harry Bannerman (born 5 March 1942) is a Scottish retired professional golfer. He is best known for playing in the 1971 Ryder Cup.

Professional career
Bannerman turned professional in late 1965, at the age of 23, and became an assistant at Royal Aberdeen Golf Club. Later he was the tournament professional at Banchory and Murcar Links Golf Club and professional at Cruden Bay and at Schloss Mainsondheim in Germany. A back injury curtailed his playing career.

Six members of the Great Britain team for the 1971 Ryder Cup were selected from a points list based on a player's best 10 performances in 15 events during the 1971 season, ending with the Benson & Hedges Festival of Golf on 21 August. Bannerman finished fourth in the points list to get a place in the team. In the match he won two and a half points out of five.

Bannerman was twice runner-up on the European Tour, being second behind Jack Newton in the 1972 Benson & Hedges Festival of Golf and to Christy O'Connor Jnr in the 1975 Carroll's Irish Open. He was also joint runner-up in the 1969 Algarve Open, behind Bernard Hunt. He played in a number of tournaments on the European Senior Tour from 1992.

Professional wins (11)
1965 Scottish Alliance Championship (as an amateur)
1967 Northern Open, Scottish Professional Championship
1969 Northern Open
1970 Cutty Sark Tournament
1971 Skol Tournament
1972 Northern Open, Scottish Coca-Cola Tournament, Scottish Professional Championship
1974 Scottish Uniroyal Tournament (tied with John McTear)
1976 Scottish Coca-Cola Tournament

Results in major championships

Note: Bannerman never played in the U.S. Open or PGA Championship.

CUT = missed the half-way cut (3rd round cut in 1976 Open Championship)
"T" indicates a tie for a place

Team appearances
Ryder Cup (representing Great Britain): 1971
World Cup (representing Scotland): 1967, 1972
R.T.V. International Trophy (representing Scotland): 1967
Double Diamond International (representing Scotland): 1972, 1974
Marlboro Nations' Cup (representing Scotland): 1972

References

External links

Scottish male golfers
European Tour golfers
European Senior Tour golfers
Ryder Cup competitors for Europe
Sportspeople from Aberdeen
1942 births
Living people